The 2013 1. divisjon (women) is the second tier of Norwegian women's football in 2013. The season kicked off on 13 April 2013, and was finished on 19 October 2013.

The top placed team was promoted to the 2014 Toppserien. The second placed team contested a playoff against the eleventh-placed team from this year's Toppserien for the right to play in Toppserien next season.

Participating teams

2012 champions Avaldsnes were promoted to the Toppserien at the end of the 2012 season. They were replaced by Fart, who were relegated from the 2012 Toppserien. Alta and Voss were relegated at the end of the 2012 season after finishing in the bottom two places of the table. They were replaced by the two playoff-winners Kaupanger and Lyn. In January 2013, Toppserien-club Kattem withdrew from the league. Their place in the 2013 Toppserien was first offered to Fart, who declined, and then to Medkila, who accepted. Alta were then offered Medkila's place in the 2013 1. divisjon, but declined. The offer then went to Voss, who accepted, and took their place in the 2013 1. divisjon despite finishing last in 2012. Subsequently, Sola withdrew their team from the 2013 1. divisjon. The football association decided not to offer Sola's place to another team. The season will therefore be played with only 11 teams.

These are the participating teams:
 Fart
 Fløya
 Fortuna Ålesund
 Grand Bodø
 Kaupanger
 Kongsvinger
 Linderud-Grei
 Lyn
 Sarpsborg 08
 Voss
 Åsane

League table

Top scorers

See also 
 2013 in Norwegian football
 2013 Toppserien

References

2011
2
Norway
Norway